Reeds Ferry is the northern portion of the town of Merrimack, New Hampshire, in the United States. Reeds Ferry is centered on the current intersection of Bedford Road and Daniel Webster Highway (U.S. Route 3) and is named after William Reed's ferry landing site on the Merrimack River located at the bottom of what is now called Depot Street.

The boundaries of the area are unclear, as the northwestern part of Merrimack near Baboosic Lake is not traditionally considered a portion of Reed's Ferry, because as a village it was defined as located on the Merrimack River. The Baboosic Lake area is separated from the Reeds Ferry village center by the Everett Turnpike, and the village center is divided from the river bank today by the railway. Reeds Ferry Elementary School is located on Lyons Road. Reeds Ferry cemetery is at the junction of Bedford Road and Route 3. The parking lot of the ferry landing site, today in use as a boat ramp for the Merrimack River, is the site of the former Reeds Ferry train station, which was in use from 1842 to 1967.

References

Reeds Ferry Landing Site history

Unincorporated communities in New Hampshire
Unincorporated communities in Hillsborough County, New Hampshire
Merrimack, New Hampshire
New Hampshire populated places on the Merrimack River